Straight Outta Compton is the debut studio album by American hip hop group N.W.A, which, led by Eazy-E, formed in Los Angeles County's City of Compton in early 1987. Released by his label, Ruthless Records, on August 8, 1988, the album was produced by N.W.A members Dr. Dre, DJ Yella, and Arabian Prince, with lyrics written by N.W.A members Ice Cube and MC Ren along with Ruthless rapper The D.O.C. Not merely depicting Compton's street violence, the lyrics repeatedly threaten to lead it by attacking peers and even police. The track "Fuck tha Police" drew an FBI agent's warning letter, which aided N.W.A's notoriety, with N.W.A calling itself "the world's most dangerous group."

In July 1989, despite its scarce radio play beyond the Los Angeles area, Straight Outta Compton received gangsta rap's first platinum certification, one million copies sold by then. That year, the album peaked at #9 on Billboards Top R&B/Hip-Hop Albums chart, and at #37 on the popular albums chart, the Billboard 200. Receiving media spotlight, N.W.A's example triggered the rap genre's movement toward hardcore, gangsta rap.

Remastered, the album's September 2002 reissue gained four bonus tracks. Nearing the album's 20th anniversary, another extended version of it arrived in December 2007. And in 2015, after an album reissue on red cassettes, theater release of the biographical film Straight Outta Compton reinvigorated sales of the album, which by year's end was certified 3x Multi-Platinum. In 2016, it became the first rap album inducted into the Grammy Hall of Fame. The next year, the Library of Congress enshrined Straight Outta Compton in the National Recording Registry, who have deemed it to be "culturally, historically, or aesthetically significant".

Background
For most of the 1980s, New York City, hip hop's 1973 birthplace, remained the rap genre's dominant scene. Until 1988, this scene, retaining more of hip hop's dance and party origin, prioritized the DJ, from a DJ crew, playing, at a dance party, electro rap and "funk hop"—akin to Afrika Bambaataa and Soulsonic Force offering, from New York, the 1982 hit "Planet Rock"—whereas the East Coast, as in Run-DMC's breakout album of 1984, had moved to prioritizing the lyricist, the "MC".

Yet around Los Angeles, DJs increasingly imparted or invited lyrics atop the party music, how the World Class Wreckin' Cru core—including Dr. Dre and DJ Yella, led by Grandmaster Lonzo—made the West Coast's first rap album, albeit electro rap, released under a major record label. But since 1982, among LA's rising lyricists was Ice-T, who heard Philadelphia rapper Schoolly D's 1985 single "P.S.K. What Does It Mean?" In 1986, thus influenced, Ice-T offered the track "6 in the Mornin', which, seizing some of LA's attention from electro rap, reached gold sales as the inaugural anthem of a new rap subgenre later called "gangsta rap".

In 1986, Eric Wright, a Kelly Park Compton Crip, was forming in Compton an independent label, Ruthless Records. Dealing drugs, Wright had become acquainted with Dr. Dre and Arabian Prince, two friends, record producers, and recording artists hitting locally but denied royalties. Upon recruiting from rap group C.I.A. a ghostwriter in Ice Cube, who was from South Central Los Angeles, Wright had Dre and Cube craft a song, "Boyz-n-the-Hood". But once a Ruthless group signed from New York City rejected it, Wright, dubbed Eazy-E, himself rapped it, a local hit. It sounded similar to Schooly D's "P.S.K." single, and its tempo was too slow to dance to.

Exceeding Ice-T's model, N.W.A imparted to gangsta rap the N.W.A signature, "exaggerated descriptions of street life, militant resistance to authority, and outright sexist violence." Locally, by supplying radio edits, N.W.A enjoyed nearly direct radio access, anyway, via Greg Mack of KDAY radio. But otherwise, even N.W.A's national debut, Straight Outta Compton, saw virtually no radio play, a fact that amplified the album's feat: the first gangsta rap certified platinum, one million copies sold. As rap fans, even from afar, sought more from Compton and South Central, local rappers, like MC Eiht of Compton's Most Wanted, met the call. LA's rap scene rapidly moved from party rap to hardcore rap.

Yet on the global stage, N.W.A towered as gangsta rap's icons. For their ostentatious lyrics, profane and strident, unrelentingly depicting violent defiance, even threatening law enforcement, an FBI agent sent the record label a warning letter, MTV banned the "Straight Outta Compton" video, some venues banned N.W.A performance, and some police officers refused to work security at N.W.A shows elsewhere. As this all sparked publicity that reinforced their aura, the rappers would allude to such facts in later raps. In any case, Slant Magazine recalls "Straight Outta Compton as the sound of the West Coast firing on New York's Fort Sumpter in what would become '90s culture's biggest Uncivil War."

Record production
The album was recorded and produced in Audio Achievements Studio in Torrance, California for $12,000. Dr. Dre, in a 1993 interview, recalls, "I threw that thing together in six weeks so we could have something to sell out of the trunk.

In an incident recalled in Jerry Heller's book and later portrayed in the film Straight Outta Compton, police approached the group while they were standing outside the studio in the fall of 1987 and demanded them to get on their knees and show ID without explanation. Outraged by the experience, Cube began writing the lyrics that would become "Fuck tha Police." Initially, still spending weekends in jail over traffic violations, Dre was reluctant to do "Fuck tha Police", a reluctance that dissolved once that sentence concluded.

Synthesis
The album's producers were Dr. Dre with DJ Yella and Arabian Prince. Considering the album's force, its production may seem surprisingly spare, mostly sampled horn blasts, some funk guitar riffs, sampled vocals, and turntable scratches atop a drum machine. Their drum machine, used for kick drums, was the Roland TR-808, which was rendered obsolete upon its 1980 release by the Linn LM-1, but cost about $1,000 versus $5,000. Used as early as 1980 by Japanese electropop group Yellow Magic Orchestra, it became hip hop's venerated "808". Its deep bass thumps, audibly artificial, lend the now classic sound of rap's 1980s and 1990s landmarks, including Straight Outta Compton precursors, like Run-DMC's launch of aggressive vocalization from 1983 to 1984, Eric B. & Rakim's inauguration of liberal sampling in 1986, Boogie Down Productions in KRS-One's assertion of criminal mindset in 1987, and Public Enemy's assault on mainstream authority and opinion in 1988.

Vocals
N.W.A's Ice Cube and MC Ren along with Ruthless Records rapper The D.O.C. wrote the lyrics, including those rapped by Eazy-E and by Dr. Dre. On the other hand, DJ Yella never raps, and Arabian Prince does only minor vocals on "Something 2 Dance 2". Otherwise, each group member stands out through a solo rap, too.

MC Ren has two solo tracks, "If It Ain't Ruff" and "Quiet on tha Set". Dr. Dre dominates "Express Yourself". Ice Cube's is "I Ain't tha 1". Eazy-E's is a remix of "8 Ball", a track which originally appeared on N.W.A's 1987 debut compilation album N.W.A. and the Posse. The one guest is The D.O.C., who raps the opening verse of "Parental Discretion Iz Advised".

Whereas Ren wrote his own lyrics, and The D.O.C. wrote some lyrics, perhaps mainly Dre's lyrics, Cube wrote some of Dre's lyrics and nearly all of Eazy's lyrics. Still, even Eazy and Dre, alike Cube and Ren, each brings a distinct delivery and character, making N.W.A altogether stand out from imitators.

Content

Reflecting in 2002, Rolling Stone writer Jon Caramanica calls the album a "bombastic, cacophonous car ride through Los Angeles' burnt-out and ignored hoods". In a contemporary review, rather, Mark Holmberg, in the Richmond Times-Dispatch, calls it "a preacher-provoking, mother-maddening, reality-stinks" album that "wallows in gangs, doping, drive-by shootings, brutal sexism, cop slamming and racism". Newsweek wrote, "Hinting at gang roots, and selling themselves on those hints, they project a gangster mystique that pays no attention to where criminality begins and marketing lets off." Even when depicting severe and unprovoked violence, the rappers cite their own stage names as its very perpetrators. By their sheer force, the album's opening three tracks—"Straight Outta Compton", "Fuck tha Police", and "Gangsta Gangsta"—signature songs setting N.W.A's platform, says AllMusic album reviewer Steve Huey, "threaten to dwarf everything that follows".

First, the title track, smearing and menacing civilians and police, men and women, while women receive gruff sexual advances, too, even threatens to "smother your mother". Then, after a skit of the police put on criminal trial, "Fuck tha Police", alleging chronic harassment and brutality by officers, singularly threatens lethal retaliation. "Gangsta Gangsta" depicts group outings to carouse with women while slurring unwilling women and assaulting men, whether confrontational troublemakers, innocent bystanders, or a driver who, fleeing the failed carjacking, gets shot at. "8 Ball" is dedicated to the 40 oz bottles of malt liquor, Olde English 800. "Express Yourself", written by Cube and rapped by Dre, incidentally scorns weed smoking—already proclaimed by Cube in "Gangsta Gangsta" as his own, chronic practice—which allegedly causes brain damage, a threat to the song's optimistic agenda, liberal individuality. "I Ain't tha 1" scorns spending money on women. "Dopeman" depicts the crack epidemic's aftermath. Closing the album, "Something 2 Dance 2" is upbeat.

The term "gangsta rap", soon to arise in journalism, had not been coined yet. According to Ice Cube, the rappers themselves called it "reality rap". Indicting N.W.A as its leading example, journalist David Mills, in 1990, acknowledges, "The hard-core street rappers defend their violent lyrics as a reflection of 'reality'. But for all the gunshots they mix into their music, rappers rarely try to dramatize that reality" empathetically. "It's easier for them to imagine themselves pulling the trigger." Still, the year before, Bud Norman, reviewing in the Wichita Eagle-Beacon, assesses that on Straight Outta Compton, "they don't make it sound like much fun". In Norman's view, "They describe it with the same nonjudgmental resignation that a Kansan"—a resident of Kansas—"might use about a tornado." Steve Huey, writing for AllMusic, considered that "Straight Outta Compton insistent claims of reality ring a little hollow today, since it hardly ever depicts consequences. But despite all the romanticized invincibility, the force and detail of Ice Cube's writing makes the exaggerations resonate."

N.W.A's Greatest Hits, released in July 1996, featured six tracks from Straight Outta Compton: "Gangsta Gangsta", "If It Ain't Ruff", "I Ain't tha 1", "Express Yourself", an extended mix of "Straight Outta Compton", and "Fuck tha Police", which is absent from Straight Outta Compton's censored version.

Release
In the United Kingdom, the album was released by 4th & B'way Records after a period that Roy Wilkinson of Sounds described as "months" of selling well as an import release.

Critical reception

Critiques

Music journalist Greg Kot, reviewing Straight Outta Compton for the Chicago Tribune, finds N.W.A's sound "fuller and funkier" than that of East Coast hip hop, and their lyrics just as "unforgiving" as those of East Coast group Public Enemy. Los Angeles Times critic Dennis Hunt anticipates that listeners may be offended by the album's lack of "moralizing", "even more so than the searing street language", and advises, "To appreciate this remarkable, disturbing album you have to approach it for what it is—a no-holds-barred, audio-documentary of ghetto life." On the other hand, Cary Darling, in California's Orange County Register, while thinking that the lyrics make Ice-T "look like a Cub Scout", ultimately deems Straight Outta Compton "curiously uninvolving", as it "lacks the insight and passion that put the best work by the likes of Boogie Down Productions, Ice-T and Public Enemy so far ahead of the field". Robert Christgau of The Village Voice perceives N.W.A's persona as calculated: "Right, it's not about salary—it's about royalties, about brandishing scarewords like 'street' and 'crazy' and 'fuck' and 'reality' until suckers black and white cough up the cash."

In the UK, Sounds reviewer Roy Wilkinson declared Straight Outta Compton "rap's answer to Slayer's Reign in Blood—a record the majors were scared to touch", continuing, "This is rock made genuinely wild again. Beware, the pop jive of the current 'Express Yourself' single will in no way prepare you for the Magnum beat that fires here." Other British publications were less enthusiastic. Paolo Hewitt of NME takes issue with the lyrics' "macho repetition and tunnel vision", while in the Hi-Fi News & Record Review, Peter Clark, going further, calls the lyrics "unrelenting in their unpleasantness". Offering the lowest possible rating, Clark adds, "The cumulative effect is like listening to an endless fight next door. The music on this record is without a hint of dynamics or melody." Charlie Dick, writing for Q, contends, "In the wake of Public Enemy and KRS-One, it is amazing that something this lightweight could cause such a stir. The all-mouth-and-trousers content is backed up by likable drum machine twittering, minimal instrumentation and duffish production." Still, he predicts, "This regressive nonsense will be passed off as social commentary by thrill-seekers all across the free world."

By 1991, while criticizing group members for allegedly carrying misogynist lyrics into real life, Newsweek incidentally comments that Straight Outta Compton, nonetheless, "introduced some of the most grotesquely exciting music ever made". Writing in retrospect, Steve Huey, in AllMusic, deems the album mainly just "raising hell" while posturing, but finds that "it still sounds refreshingly uncalculated because of its irreverent, gonzo sense of humor, still unfortunately rare in hardcore rap". In the 2004 Rolling Stone Album Guide, Roni Sarig states that although Straight Outta Compton was viewed as a "perversion" of the "more politically sophisticated" style of hip hop exemplified by Public Enemy, the album displays "a more righteous fury than the hundreds of copycats it spawned".

Rankings
In 1994, British magazine Hip Hop Connection, placing the album third among rap's best albums, adds, "Straight Outta Compton sounded so exciting, insignificant details such as realism and integrity could be overlooked." Hip hop magazine The Source included Straight Outta Compton in its 1998 "100 Best Albums" list. Television network VH1, in 2003, placed it 62nd. Spin magazine, sorting the "100 Greatest Albums, 1985–2005", identified it 10th.

The first rap album ever to gain five stars from Rolling Stone at initial review, it placed 70th among the magazine's 500 Greatest Albums of All Time in its 2020 revised list. Time, in 2006, named it one of the 100 greatest albums of all time. Vibe appraised it as one of the 100 Essential Albums of the 20th Century. In 2012, Slant Magazine listed it 18th among the "Best Albums of the 1980s". In any case, in November 2016, Straight Outta Compton became the first rap album inducted into the Grammy Hall of Fame. In 2017, Straight Outta Compton was selected for preservation in the United States National Recording Registry by the Library of Congress, who deemed it to be "culturally, historically, or aesthetically significant".

Charting and sales
N.W.A's album best selling, Straight Outta Compton, released in August 1988, attained gold certification, half a million copies sold, on April 13, 1989. Meanwhile, the album peaked at number #9 on Billboards Top R&B/Hip-Hop Albums chart, and on April 15, 1989, at #37 on the Billboard 200, which ranks the week's most popular albums. On July 18, 1989, the album was certified platinum, one million copies sold.

By contrast, N.W.A. and the Posse, out since November 1987, reached gold certification in September 1994. The group's 100 Miles and Runnin' EP, which took two years to produce and was released in August 1990, went platinum in September 1992. That year, on March 27, Straight Outta Compton was certified double-platinum, two million copies sold.

By Priority Records' estimation, about 80% of Straight Outta Compton's sales occurred in suburban areas predominantly white. N.W.A's next and final full-length album, Efil4zaggin or Niggaz4Life, released in late May 1991, went platinum just over two months later, in August 1991, yet in 2020 remains platinum, whereas on November 11, 2015, Straight Outta Compton was certified triple-platinum, three million copies sold.

Approaching the August 2015 release of the film Straight Outta Compton, the album reentered the Billboard 200 at number #173. The next week, it rose to #97, another week later reached #30—beyond its 1989 peak position of #37—and on September 5 peaked at #6. Meanwhile, the album's title track, entering the popular songs chart, the Billboard Hot 100, becoming N.W.A's first song in the Top 40, spent two weeks at #38.

Media presence
In 2004, the DigitaArts list 25 Best Albums Covers included Straight Outta Compton. By the album's release, Arabian Prince, on the cover, had left N.W.A. Lacking him, an iconic group photo taken by Ithaka Darin Pappas on November 11, 1988, at Pappa's studio apartment in Los Angeles' Miracle Mile district, has been repeatedly republished in media, including The Source May 1989 cover, captioning, "California Rap Hits Nationwide!" Pappas calls it the "Miracle Mile Shot", the DVD cover of the 2015 documentary Kings Of Compton, in France's Musée d'art contemporain de Marseille from 2017 to 2018, and a backdrop at N.W.A's Rock and Roll Hall of Fame induction ceremony in 2016 in Brooklyn, New York.

Sinéad O'Connor, then herself controversial, appraised in 1990 that "It's definitely the best rap record I've ever heard". But, feeling that he had rushed its production, N.W.A's own Dr. Dre, in a 1993 interview, remarked, "To this day, I can't stand that album." On the other hand, in 2005, comedian Chris Rock still ranked it the top rap album of all time. The next year, parodic music artist "Weird Al" Yankovic released a new album, Straight Outta Lynwood. Punk rock band NOFX released the 2009 song "Straight Outta Massachusetts". In the 2014 film 22 Jump Street, the character Mrs. Dickson, whose husband is played by Ice Cube, says she's "straight outta Compton". In 2015, the biopic Straight Outta Compton was a hit film.

Track listing
All songs produced by Dr. Dre and DJ Yella & Arabian Prince

Personnel
Eazy-E – rapping (seven songs)
Ice Cube – rapping (six songs)
MC Ren – rapping (eight songs)
Arabian Prince – keyboards & drum programming (five songs) & rapping (one song)
Dr. Dre – keyboards & drum programming (five songs), rapping (five songs)
DJ Yella – sampling & drum programming (seven songs), rapping (one song)
The D.O.C. (guest) – rapping (one song)

Charts

Certifications

See also
 Album era
Straight Outta Compton: N.W.A 10th Anniversary Tribute

Notes

External links

Straight Outta Compton (Adobe Flash) at Radio3Net (streamed copy where licensed)
 Straight Outta Compton at Discogs
 "Outlaw Rock: More Skirmishes on the Censorship Front" — The New York Times
 

1988 debut albums
N.W.A albums
Albums produced by Dr. Dre
Ruthless Records albums
Compton, California
United States National Recording Registry recordings
Obscenity controversies in music
United States National Recording Registry albums